John Grant (born 19 March 1950) is an Australian businessman, rugby league football administrator and former chairman of the Australian Rugby League Commission which controls rugby league in Australia. A former player of the 1970s, he was a Queensland interstate representative three-quarter back and a member of the Australian team which lost the 1972 World Cup to Great Britain in France. Grant had been playing his club football for the Brisbane Rugby League's Souths club under Wayne Bennett. Following the World Cup, Grant joined English club Warrington, playing for them during their table-topping 1972–73 season.

Grant had completed an engineering degree at the University of Queensland before taking up a scholarship with Brisbane City Council. He went on to head the information technology company Data3 and become chairman of the Australian Information Industry Association. In 2011 Grant was named as the inaugural chairman of the Australian Rugby League Commission. The 2012 NRL season was the Commission's first in control of the League.

References

External links
ARLC profile

1950 births
Living people
Australia national rugby league team players
Australian rugby league administrators
Australian Rugby League Commissioners
Australian rugby league players
Queensland rugby league team players
Rugby league players from Brisbane
Rugby league wingers
Souths Logan Magpies players
University of Queensland alumni
Warrington Wolves players